
Gmina Nasielsk is an urban-rural gmina (administrative district) in Nowy Dwór County, Masovian Voivodeship, in east-central Poland.

Villages
Apart from the town of Nasielsk, Gmina Nasielsk contains the villages and settlements of Aleksandrowo, Andzin, Borkowo, Broninek, Budy Siennickie, Cegielnia Psucka, Chechnówka, Chlebiotki, Chrcynno, Cieksyn, Czajki, Dąbrowa, Dębinki, Dobra Wola, Głodowo Wielkie, Jackowo Dworskie, Jackowo Włościańskie, Jaskółowo, Kątne, Kędzierzawice, Konary, Kosewo, Krogule, Krzyczki Szumne, Krzyczki-Pieniążki, Krzyczki-Żabiczki, Lelewo, Lorcin, Lubomin, Lubominek, Malczyn, Mazewo Dworskie A, Mazewo Dworskie B, Mazewo Włościańskie, Miękoszyn, Miękoszynek, Młodzianowo, Mogowo, Mokrzyce Dworskie, Mokrzyce Włościańskie, Morgi, Nowa Wieś, Nowa Wrona, Nowe Pieścirogi, Nowiny, Nuna, Paulinowo, Pianowo-Bargły, Pianowo-Daczki, Pniewo, Pniewska Górka, Popowo Borowe, Popowo-Północ, Popowo-Południe, Psucin, Ruszkowo, Siennica, Słustowo, Stare Pieścirogi, Studzianki, Toruń Dworski, Toruń Włościański, Wągrodno, Wiktorowo, Winniki, Żabiczyn and Zaborze.

Neighbouring gminas
Gmina Nasielsk is bordered by the gminas of Joniec, Nowe Miasto, Pomiechówek, Serock, Świercze, Winnica and Zakroczym.

References

Polish official population figures 2006

Nasielsk
Nowy Dwór Mazowiecki County